In enzymology, an acetylpyruvate hydrolase is an enzyme that catalyzes the chemical reaction

acetylpyruvate + H2O  acetate + pyruvate

Thus, the two substrates of this enzyme are acetylpyruvate and H2O, whereas its two products are acetate and pyruvate.

This enzyme belongs to the family of hydrolases, specifically those acting on carbon-carbon bonds in ketonic substances.  The systematic name of this enzyme class is 2,4-dioxopentanoate acetylhydrolase.

References

 

EC 3.7.1
Enzymes of unknown structure